Phat Kanhol (1920 – 1 February 1970) was the first wife of Norodom Sihanouk, former King of Cambodia. She was the mother of Princess Norodom Buppha Devi (1943–2019) and Prince Norodom Ranariddh (1944–2021). She and King Sihanouk separated in 1946. She died on 1 February 1970.

References

1920 births
1969 deaths
House of Norodom
Cambodian royalty
Spouses of prime ministers of Cambodia